The coat of arms of Windsor, Ontario, is a coat of arms that symbolizes the city's past, present, and its culture. The two lions represent royalty and allegiance to The Crown; the deer represents the richness in wildlife in the area. The automobile wheel represents the city's automobile industry. Roses represent the city's warm climate and numerous parks, as well as its nickname "City of Roses". The shield shows the fleur-de-lis, for its French Canadian population, with the Detroit River along the bottom. The ribbon along the bottom is the city's motto: "The River and the Land Sustain Us".

References

External links
Page on City of Windsor site

Windsor
Coat of Arms
Windsor, Ontario
Windsor, Ontario
Windsor, Ontario
Windsor, Ontario
Windsor, Ontario